Hellmut Theimer (15 February 1928 – August 1984) was an Austrian water polo player. He competed in the men's tournament at the 1952 Summer Olympics.

References

External links
  

1928 births
1984 deaths
Austrian male water polo players
Olympic water polo players of Austria
Water polo players at the 1952 Summer Olympics
Place of birth missing